Manuel González Tello (21 February 1929 – 22 September 2013) was a Spanish professional footballer who played as a defender.

Career
González's senior career began with Murcia, making nine appearances and scoring one goal (versus Linense) during the 1949–50 Segunda División season. In 1953, González joined La Liga's Osasuna. He made his professional debut on 13 September during a 2–0 loss to Real Madrid at the Estadio Chamartín. Osasuna were relegated in that campaign, remaining in tier two until 1956 when González scored once in twenty-nine fixtures as Osasuna won the 1955–56 title. He subsequently featured ninety-nine times and netted twice in four future seasons in La Liga. González had a short spell with Málaga in 1960.

After leading Málaga to the 1960 Tercera División trophy, he returned to Osasuna later that year. The final match of his career was a 1960–61 Copa del Generalísimo tie with Extremadura in October 1960. González died in September 2013 in Pamplona, aged 84.

Career statistics

Honours
Osasuna
Segunda División: 1955–56

References

External links

1929 births
2013 deaths
Footballers from Málaga
Spanish footballers
Association football defenders
Segunda División players
La Liga players
Tercera División players
Real Murcia players
CA Osasuna players
Málaga CF players